The Remembrancer is a subordinate officer of the English Exchequer.

Remembrancer may also refer to:

 City Remembrancer, one of the City of London Corporation's Chief Officers
 Queen's Remembrancer, an ancient judicial post in the legal system of England and Wales
 Queen's and Lord Treasurer's Remembrancer, an officer in Scotland who represents the Crown's interests
 Remembrancer (horse), a British Thoroughbred racehorse